Manuel "Manu" Sánchez de la Peña (born 24 August 2000) is a Spanish professional footballer who plays as a left-back for CA Osasuna, on loan from Atlético Madrid.

Club career
Sánchez was born in Madrid, and joined Atlético Madrid's youth setup in 2014, from UE Cornellà. He made his senior debut with the reserves on 30 March 2019, starting in a 2–0 Segunda División B away win against Salamanca CF UDS.

On 30 August 2019, Sánchez renewed his contract with Atleti until 2023. He made his first team – and La Liga – debut on 14 December, starting in a 2–0 home defeat of CA Osasuna.

On 7 September 2020, Sánchez further extended his contract until 2025. The following 11 January, he moved to fellow top tier side Osasuna on loan for the remainder of the season.

On 17 August 2021, Sánchez returned to Osasuna on loan for the 2021–22 campaign. On 27 July 2022, the loan was extended for an additional year.

Career statistics

References

External links

2000 births
Living people
Footballers from Madrid
Spanish footballers
Association football fullbacks
La Liga players
Segunda División B players
Atlético Madrid B players
Atlético Madrid footballers
CA Osasuna players
Spain under-21 international footballers